is a manga written by josei manga artist Nanae Haruno (榛野なな恵). The three chapter long story was first published by Shueisha Publishing Company in 1998. The storyline discusses yuri and transgender topics.

Characters 
Maho Ryoutarou is a trans woman starring in the series. She is described as being feminine, tall, and beautiful in the three chapters. She works at a place called Bar Arthur with other transgender females. Maho often discusses the difficulties she faces in her life because of her identity as a Trans woman.

Fujiko Kouzu is a young girl from a rich family. Because of poor family dynamics, she lies to her parents about studying abroad in Switzerland when she is really working and going to school near home. Soon upon meeting Maho, Fujiko falls in love with her but continues to act in a platonic manner towards her. She begins cutting her hair progressively shorter during the second chapter of the manga.

Koko-Chan is first introduced in the third chapter. She is another trans woman who works at Bar Arthur with Maho.

Plot 
The first chapter shows how Maho and Fujiko meet and develop a relationship. One night Fujiko is harassed on the street by a male stranger and Maho scares him off. After this encounter, the two realize that they live in the same building. Their friendship further develops a few nights later when Fujiko finds Maho drunk and unconscious in their apartment stairwell. Maho discovers the Fujiko comes from a wealthy family from a picture in an old magazine. After Maho confronts Fujiko about this, Fujiko admits that she has fallen in love with Maho.

In the second chapter Fujiko begins to cut her hair shorter. Maho's coworkers find out about her friendship with Fujiko and berate her about their relationship being inappropriate. Maho quickly settles the matter, explaining that there is no inappropriate conduct taking place. Maho notices that a man is following her and Fujiko around the city, and confronts him after a day of shopping. The man is Fujiko's former fiancé who was stalking her because she had previously cut off their engagement. At one point when they are alone, Fujiko tells Maho that she reminds her of her sister. However, when the ex-fiancé returns drunkenly to Maho's place of work, he tells her that Fujiko does not and never had a sister. This mystery is not resolved.

The third chapter is less focused on Maho and Fujiko. Instead, the story revolves around one of Maho's coworkers named Koko-chan. In the beginning of the chapter Koko-chan does not come to work and it is noted by another coworker that she went through a breakup. Maho is asked to visit her, so she goes the next day with Fujiko. Koko-chan tells them that she plans to return to work in a few days. When she does return, however, Koko-chan brings an abandoned infant that she found in a park with her, claiming it to be her own. Maho spends a significant portion of the chapter trying to convince Koko-chan to turn the child over to the authorities. Once the child has been returned, Maho and Fujiko discuss the complications with having children while Trans. Towards the end of the chapter, Fujiko runs into Koko-chan on the street, and Koko-chan tells her that she plans to go out into the world to help children in need elsewhere.

References

External links

1998 manga
Yuri (genre) anime and manga
Shueisha manga
Josei manga
Transgender in anime and manga
1990s LGBT literature
Transgender-related comics